Bank Square may refer to several places

Poland
Bank Square, Warsaw

United Kingdom
Bank Square, Aberystwyth
Bank Square, Dulverton, Somerset
Bank Square, St Just in Penwith
Bank Square, Wilmslow